Smith College is a private liberal arts women's college in Northampton, Massachusetts. It was chartered in 1871 by Sophia Smith and opened in 1875. It is the largest member of the historic Seven Sisters colleges, a group of elite women's colleges in the Northeastern United States. Smith is also a member of the Five College Consortium, along with four other nearby institutions in the Pioneer Valley: Mount Holyoke College, Amherst College, Hampshire College, and the University of Massachusetts Amherst; students of each college are allowed to attend classes at any other member institution. On campus are Smith's Museum of Art and Botanic Garden, the latter designed by Frederick Law Olmsted.

Smith has 41 academic departments and programs and is structured around an open curriculum, lacking course requirements and scheduled final exams. It is known for its progressive, politically active student body, and rigorous academics. Undergraduate admissions is exclusively restricted to women, although Smith announced a trans-inclusive admissions policy in 2015. Smith offers several graduate degrees, all of which accept applicants regardless of gender, and co-administers programs leading to Ph.D.s alongside other Five College Consortium members. The college was the first historically women's college to offer an undergraduate engineering degree. Admissions is considered highly selective. It was the first women's college to join the NCAA, and its sports teams are known as the Pioneers.

Smith alumnae include notable authors, journalists, activists, feminists, politicians, philanthropists, actresses, filmmakers, academics, businesswomen, CEOs, two First Ladies of the United States, and recipients of the Pulitzer Prize, Rhodes Scholarship, Academy Award, Emmy Award, MacArthur Grant, Peabody Award, and Tony Award.

History

Early history 

The college was chartered in 1871 by a bequest of Sophia Smith and opened its doors in 1875 with 14 students and 6 faculty. When she inherited a fortune from her father at age 65, Smith decided to leave her inheritance to found a women's college was the best way for her to fulfill the moral obligation she expressed in her will:

The campus was planned and planted in the 1890s as a botanical garden and arboretum, designed by noted American landscape architect, Frederick Law Olmsted. The campus landscape now encompasses  and includes more than 1,200 varieties of trees and shrubs.

By 1915–16, the student enrollment was 1,724, and the faculty numbered 163. Today, with some 2,600 undergraduates on campus and 250 students studying elsewhere, Smith is the largest privately endowed college for women in the country.

United States Naval Reserve Midshipmen's School 
The United States Naval Reserve Midshipmen's School at Smith College was training grounds for junior officers of the Women's Reserve of the U.S. Naval Reserve (WAVES) and was nicknamed "USS Northampton". On August 28, 1942, a total of 120 women reported to the school for training.

21st century 
On December 10, 2012, the Board of Trustees announced Kathleen McCartney had been selected as the 11th president of Smith College, effective July 1, 2013.

In April 2015, the faculty adopted an open-access policy to make its scholarship publicly accessible online.

Presidents 
Smith has been led by 11 presidents and two acting presidents. (Elizabeth Cutter Morrow was the first acting president of Smith College and the first female head of the college, but she did not use the title of president.) For the 1975 centennial, the college inaugurated its first woman president, Jill Ker Conway, who came to Smith from Australia by way of Harvard and the University of Toronto. Since President Conway's term, all Smith presidents have been women, with the exception of John M. Connolly's one-year term as acting president in the interim after President Simmons left to lead Brown University.
 Laurenus Clark Seelye 1875–1910
 Marion LeRoy Burton 1910–1917
 William Allan Neilson 1917–1939
 Elizabeth Cutter Morrow 1939–1940 (acting president)
 Herbert Davis 1940–1949
 Benjamin Fletcher Wright 1949–1959
 Thomas Corwin Mendenhall 1959–1975
 Jill Ker Conway 1975–1985
 Mary Maples Dunn 1985–1995
 Ruth Simmons 1995–2001
 John M. Connolly 2001–2002 (acting president)
 Carol T. Christ 2002–2013
 Kathleen McCartney 2013–present

Academics

Smith College has 285 professors in 41 academic departments and programs, for a faculty-student ratio of 1:9. It was the first women's college in the United States to grant its own undergraduate degrees in engineering. The Picker Engineering Program offers a single ABET accredited Bachelor of Science in engineering science, combining the fundamentals of multiple engineering disciplines. 

In 2008, Smith joined the SAT optional movement for undergraduate admission.

Smith runs its own junior year abroad (JYA) programs in four European cities: Paris, Hamburg, Florence, and Geneva. These programs are notable for requiring all studies to be conducted in the language of the host country (with both Paris and Geneva programs conducted in French). In some cases, students live in homestays with local families. Nearly half of Smith's juniors study overseas, either through Smith JYA programs or at more than 40 other locations around the world.

Junior math majors from other undergraduate institutions are invited to study at Smith College for one year through the Center for Women in Mathematics. Established in the fall of 2007 by Professors Ruth Haas and Jim Henle, the program aims to allow young women to improve their mathematical abilities through classwork, research, and involvement in a department centered on women. The Center also offers a post-baccalaureate year of math study to women who did not major in mathematics as undergraduates or whose mathematics major was not strong.

The Louise W. and Edmund J. Kahn Liberal Arts Institute supports collaborative research without regard to the traditional boundaries of academic departments and programs. Each year the institute supports long-term and short-term projects proposed, planned, and organized by members of the Smith College faculty. By becoming Kahn Fellows, students get involved in interdisciplinary research projects and work alongside faculty and visiting scholars for a year.

Students can develop leadership skills through Smith's two-year Phoebe Reese Lewis Leadership Program. Participants train in public speaking, analytical thinking, teamwork strategies, and the philosophical aspects of leadership.

Through Smith's internship program, "Praxis: The Liberal Arts at Work," all undergraduates are guaranteed access to one college-funded internship during their years at the college. This program enables students to access interesting self-generated internship positions in social welfare and human services, the arts, media, health, education, and other fields.

Its most popular undergraduate majors, based on 2021 graduates, were:
Research & Experimental Psychology (49)
Biology/Biological Sciences (48)
Political Science & Government (45)
Engineering Science (36)
History (30)
English Language & Literature (25)
Mathematics (23)
Economics (23)
Computer Science (22)

Ada Comstock Scholars Program

The Ada Comstock Scholars Program is an undergraduate degree program that serves Smith students of nontraditional college age. The program accommodates approximately 100 women ranging in age from mid-twenties to over sixty. Ada Comstock Scholars attend the same classes as traditional undergraduates, either full or part-time, and participate fully in a variety of extracurricular activities. They may live on or off campus. Financial aid is available to each Ada Comstock Scholar with demonstrated need.

Beginning in 1968, with the approval of the Committee on Educational Policy, Smith College initiated a trial program loosely titled The Continuing Education Degree for several women of non-traditional age who were looking to complete their unfinished degrees. Their successes inspired President Thomas C. Mendenhall and Dean Alice Dickinson to officially expand the program. In January 1975, the Ada Comstock Scholars Program has formally established under President Jill Ker Conway and in the fall of that year, forty-five women were enrolled. The students range in age, background, and geographical location. The growth of the program peaked at just over 400 students in 1988.

The program is named for Ada Louise Comstock Notestein (1876–1973), an 1897 Smith graduate, professor of English and dean of Smith from 1912 to 1923, and president of Radcliffe College from 1923 to 1943. Ada Comstock Notestein devoted much of her life to the academic excellence of women. Considering education and personal growth to be a lifelong process, she stayed actively involved in women's higher education until her death at the age of 97.

Graduate degrees and study options 

Smith's graduate program is open to applicants of any gender. Degrees offered are Master of Arts in teaching (elementary, middle or high school), master of fine arts, master of education of the deaf, Master of Science in biological sciences, Master of Science in exercise and sport studies and master and Ph.D. in social work. In special one-year programs, international students may qualify for a certificate of graduate studies or a diploma in American studies. Each year approximately 100 men and women pursue advanced graduate work at Smith.

Also offered as a non-degree studies program is the Diploma in American Studies. This is a highly competitive one-year program open only to international students of advanced undergraduate or graduate standing. It is designed primarily, although not exclusively, for those who are teaching or who plan to teach some aspect of American culture and institutions.

The Smith College School for Social Work is nationally recognized for its specialization in clinical social work and puts a heavy emphasis on direct field work practice. The program is accredited by the Council on Social Work Education. The school offers a Master of Social Work (M.S.W.) degree as well as a Ph.D. program designed to prepare MSWs for leadership positions in clinical research education and practice.

The college has a limited number of other programs leading to Ph.D.s and is part of a cooperative doctoral program co-administered by Amherst College, Hampshire College, Mount Holyoke College and the University of Massachusetts Amherst.

Admissions and rankings

Admissions

The 2022 annual ranking of U.S. News & World Report categorizes Smith as 'most selective'.

For the Class of 2022 (enrolling fall 2018), Smith received 5,780 applications, accepted 1,789 (31.0%), and enrolled 613. The middle 50% range of SAT scores was 670–750 for critical reading and 670–770 for math, while the middle 50% range for the ACT composite score was 31–34 for enrolled first-year students. The average SAT for Smith College is 1430 even though Smith is also a test-optional college.

Rankings

U.S. News & World Reports 2021 rankings placed Smith tied for the 15th overall best liberal arts college in the U.S., and rated it eighth for "Best Value", tied for 17th in "Best Undergraduate Engineering Program" at schools where doctorate not offered, tied for 19th in "Best Undergraduate Teaching", and tied for 94th in "Top Performers on Social Mobility". In 2019, Forbes rated Smith 81st overall in its America's Top Colleges ranking of 650 military academies, national universities, and liberal arts colleges. Kiplinger's Personal Finance places Smith 16th in its 2019 ranking of 149 best value liberal arts colleges in the United States.  For 2020, Washington Monthly ranked Smith 23rd among 218 liberal arts colleges in the U.S. based on its contribution to the public good, as measured by social mobility, research, and promoting public service. Smith College is accredited by the New England Commission of Higher Education.

Traditions

Residential culture and student life
Smith requires most undergraduate students to live in on-campus houses unless they reside locally with their families. This policy is intended to add to the camaraderie and social cohesion of its students. Unlike most institutions of its type, Smith College does not have dorms, but rather 36 separate houses, ranging in architectural style from 18th-century to contemporary. It is rumored the architecture of Chapin House was the inspiration for the Tara Plantation House in Gone with the Wind. (Author Margaret Mitchell went to Smith for one year and lived in Chapin.) A novelty of Smith's homelike atmosphere is the continuing popularity of Sophia Smith's recipe for molasses cookies. These are often served at the traditional Friday afternoon tea held in each house, where students, faculty and staff members, and alumnae socialize.

Two cultural spaces on campus are used by students of color to build their community: the Mwangi Cultural Center and Unity House. Mwangi originally opened as the Afro-American Cultural Center in 1968 but was later renamed in honor of the first female physician in Kenya, and Smith alum, Dr. Ng’endo Mwangi ('61). After loaning Mwangi to the other cultural organizations on campus for four years, the Black Students’ Alliance decided to reclaim Mwangi in April 1990. Leaders, members, and supporters of cultural organizations got together to form a group called UNITY, in October of the same year, to demand a space for other cultural organizations. Today, Unity House serves as a home to the 11 cultural organizations on campus.

Two recent additions to the campus, both of which enhance its sense of community, are the architecturally dramatic Julia McWilliams Child '34 Campus Center  and the state-of-the-art Olin Fitness Center.

In 2009, construction was also completed on Ford Hall, a new science and engineering facility. According to the Smith College website, Ford Hall is a "...facility that will intentionally blur the boundaries between traditional disciplines, creating an optimum environment for students and faculty to address key scientific and technological developments of our time." The building was officially dedicated on October 16, 2009.

The campus also boasts a botanic garden that includes a variety of specialty gardens including a rock garden and historic glass greenhouses dating back to 1895. The botanic garden formerly featured a Japanese tea hut, which was removed in October 2015 following concerns over "issues of safety and vandalism."

Smith offers "panel discussions and seminars for lesbian, bisexual, and transgender students on subjects such as coming out as transgender at work." In 2003, Smith students voted to remove pronouns from the language of the Student Government Association constitution, in order to make that document inclusive of transgender students who don't identify with the pronouns "she" and "her."

Until 2013, transgender women were not allowed to attend Smith unless all their legal documentation consistently stated they were female. This policy came to public attention in March 2013 when Smith rejected the application of a trans woman named Calliope Wong. In the rejection letter, Smith's Dean of Admission Debra Shaver wrote "Your FAFSA indicates your gender as male. Therefore, Smith cannot process your application." This policy was changed in 2013 to only require all nonlegal application materials to indicate a female identity, including references. Not satisfied with the change, students as well as various alumni formed the group Q&A ("Queers and Allies") to advocate for more trans-inclusive policies. Q&A subsequently protested the policy on Facebook and other social media websites, as well as staging protests on campus that garnered significant media attention. In 2014, Smith formed an Admissions Policy Study Group, co-chaired by Daphne Lamothe and Audrey Smith, who at the time were an associate professor of Afro-American studies and vice president for enrollment, respectively. The group recommended that to be considered for admission to Smith, applicants live and/or identify as a woman, check the "female" box when applying and that the President establish a working group to support all trans and non-binary students at Smith. These recommendations went to the faculty and the Board of Trustees and in 2015, Smith announced a new policy that only required female identification on the common application. Under the policy, transgender men and non-binary or genderqueer applicants are not eligible for admission. This new policy also affirms that any student who, once admitted, transitions to another identity other than "female" and, who completes the college's graduation requirements, will be awarded a Smith degree. The Resource Center for Sexuality and Gender; The Office for Equity and Inclusion and its Trans/Non-binary Working Group; Transcending Gender, a student group focused on support and education; and the Transgender Support Group run by Counseling Services work to support trans and non-binary students at Smith across the gender identity spectrum.

In the fall of 2018, students at Smith protested after a Smith employee called the police on a black student working at Smith over the summer when the employee saw her in a common space. Organized by the Black Students’ Alliance and the Smith African & Caribbean Students Association, students protested and walked out of the annual Smith convocation. While the incident received national attention and news coverage, Smith conducted an independent investigation and investigators found that there was no bias in the incident. In response to the incident, Smith hosted an Inclusion and Diversity Conference on April 10, 2019, featuring workshops and presenters run by various members of the Smith community. However, during that time another controversy arose: the hiring of Mount Holyoke College and Smith's joint police chief, Daniel Hect. Students from both campuses brought to their administrators' attention the fact that Hect had "liked" right-wing tweets on Twitter, such as Donald Trump tweeting "Build that Wall!" and a tweet from the National Rifle Association, before deleting his account once the conflict with students began. At the conference, students protested a presentation from the campus police, including Hect, about policing in a diverse community. Protests continued the next day when hundreds of students participated in a sit-in organized by the group Students for Social Justice and Institutional Change outside of John M. Greene Hall. The coalition presented a broad list of demands to the administration, proposing reform to many sectors of campus life, including curriculum, health and counseling services, accessibility, policing, admissions policies, and affinity housing. In response to the demands, Smith launched a working group charged with identifying key themes in response to the day of inclusion and ensuing protests and revamped the Office of Equity and Inclusion, adding programmatic changes, new or modified positions, training and development opportunities and new events to promote inclusion and equity.

In October 2020, Smith alumna Jodi Shaw, then Student Support Coordinator in the Department of Residence Life, began posting videos commenting on mandated diversity training for staff at Smith College on her YouTube channel. Shaw characterized the training as contributing to a climate of "harassment, discrimination, and hostility" at the college, especially for staff. On February 19, 2021, columnist Bari Weiss published Shaw's resignation letter on Weiss's Substack blog. In it, Shaw described the implementation of the training as "psychologically abusive" and the culture as "deeply hostile and fearful." She alleged that the college had "offered a settlement in exchange for my silence, but I turned it down". On February 22, Smith College published a letter from President Kathleen McCartney alleging that an unnamed former employee had accused the college of "creating a racially hostile environment for white people, a baseless claim that the college flatly denies," and that "it was the employee herself who demanded payment of an exceptionally large sum in exchange for dropping a threatened legal claim and agreeing to standard confidentiality provisions." McCartney affirmed that the college's "commitment to, and strategies for, advancing equity and inclusion are grounded in evidence."

On February 24, 2021, the New York Times reported on worsening tensions between students, staff, and administrators around issues of racial justice and the college's diversity training. President McCartney stated that "Good training is never about making people too uncomfortable or to feel ashamed or anything. I think our staff is content and are embracing it." A former janitor told the paper that he had gone through numerous training sessions in race and intersectionality at Smith and that they had left staff workers cynical.

Houses

Smith College has many different houses serving as dormitories. Each house is self-governing. While many students remain in the same house for the entirety of their four years at Smith, they are not obligated to do so and may move to different houses on campus as space allows. While houses previously collected dues, in the 2019–2020 school year they were eradicated to avoid placing financial pressure on low-income students or students who were otherwise unable to pay without sacrificing funding for the House.

Houses are found in four main regions of campus: Upper and Lower Elm Street, Green Street, Center Campus, and the Quadrangle. Each part can, in turn, be divided into smaller areas to more precisely provide the location of the house in question. In 2019, the college shifted from officially recognizing the four main areas of campus to instead categorizing houses in four neighborhoods: Ivy, Paradise, Mountain, and Garden. This change was largely internal and categorizes houses by size rather than location.

Green Street houses
 Hubbard House – Hubbard House is the residence of fictional President Selina Meyer from the HBO Show Veep. Julia Child resided in this house during her time at Smith.
 Lawrence House – Sylvia Plath resided in this house during her time at Smith.
 Morris House – Morris was built in 1891, with its sister house Lawrence to help accommodate the growing student body. It is named after Kate Morris Cone, Smith College class of 1879.
 Tyler House – Named after William Seymour Tyler, one of the original trustees of the college. Former First Lady Barbara Bush lived here before she left to marry George Bush.
 Washburn House – Washburn is named for former trustee and senator William B. Washburn. During the Second World War, the house served as a Spanish-speaking residence for students unable to study abroad.  
 44 Green Street
 54 Green Street

Center Campus houses
 Cutter House
 Chapin House – Author Margaret Mitchell lived here. Chapin's staircase served as the inspiration for the staircase of Scarlett O'Hara's Tara in Gone With the Wind.
 Haven/Wesley Houses
 Hopkins House
 Park Complex
Park Annex – one of two new Affinity houses at Smith College, houses that cater to minority identities on campus.
 Sessions Complex – the oldest house on the Smith campus. It has a secret passageway.
 Tenney House
 Ziskind House

Upper Elm Street houses

 Capen House – Built in 1825 by Samuel Howe, the founder of Northampton Law School, it became part of the Capen School in 1883 and was willed to the college by the school's founder in 1921. It is designed in the Classical Revival style. It is named after the founder of the Capen School, Bessie Talbot Capen. 
 Gillett House – Connected to Northrop house via a breezeway, Gillett houses the only vegan/vegetarian dining hall on campus.
 Lamont House – Built in 1955, Lamont House was the first house constructed after the construction of the Quad houses in 1936. Named for alumna Florence Corliss Lamont, who earned her A.B. in 1893 and later an M.A. from Columbia. She married Harvard graduate and future Smith Trustee Thomas Lamont and had four children. Throughout her life, she would continue to give generously to her alma mater. Lamont House is just across Elm Street, tucked behind Northrop and Gillett Houses. Lamont houses 83 students.
 Northrop House
 Parsons Complex
Parsons Annex – one of two new Affinity houses at Smith College, houses that cater to minority identities on campus.
 Talbot House – Built in 1909 as part of the Capen School, it was willed to the college in 1921. Its mascot is the moose. US First Lady Nancy Reagan '43 lived here during her time at Smith. It is also named for Bessie Talbot Capen.

Lower Elm Street houses
 Albright House
 Baldwin House – U.S. Senator Tammy Baldwin ('84) was a Baldwin House resident during her time at Smith College.
 Chase House – Once a school for girls from the 1870s until 1968 when it was acquired as housing for the college. It was once a Junior & Senior only house and now serves as a substance-free residence. Named after Mary Ellen Chase, a writer, and English professor.
 Conway House – A residence for Ada Comstock Scholars and their families, named after Smith President Jill Ker Conway
 Duckett House
 150 Elm Street

East Quadrangle houses
 Cushing House – named for math professor Eleanor P. Cushing; Gloria Steinem resided here during her time at Smith.
 Emerson House
 Jordan House – Built in 1922 and named for the longtime head of the Smith English Department, Mary Augusta Jordan.
 King House – Named for Franklin King, who served as the superintendent of building and grounds at Smith for 50 years 
 Scales House -King's "sister house," was named after Laura Woolsey Lord Scales, who graduated from Smith in 1901 and was the school's first dean of students 

West Quadrangle houses
 Comstock House – Named after Ada Comstock class of 1897, former dean of the college and president of Radcliffe College
 Gardiner House
 Morrow House – Named after Elizabeth Cutter Morrow, class of 1896 and former acting president of the college
 Wilder House
 Wilson House – Named after Martha Wilson, class of 1895
 Paradise Apartments – each complex is named after a notable Smith Alum

Campus folklore
Smith has numerous folk tales and ghost stories emerging from the histories of some of its historic buildings. It was named the most haunted college in America by College Consensus. One such tale holds Sessions House is inhabited by the ghost of Lucy Hunt, who died of a broken heart after being separated from her lover, General Burgoyne. Reports of a ghost in Sessions House predate its history as a campus house. Built in 1751 by the Hunt family, the house has a secret staircase where, according to legend, the Hunt's eldest daughter Lucy would rendezvous with her lover, General Burgoyne. The two were ultimately driven apart, and in the 1880s it was believed the ghost of a heartbroken Burgoyne haunted the staircase. Since Sessions House became part of college housing in the 20th century, the specter has taken on a decidedly feminine identity, and some former residents of Sessions claim to have seen Lucy's ghost in the stairwell.

Clubs, sports, and organizations
In addition to its 11 varsity sports, there are currently more than 120 clubs and organizations that cater to Smith students’ variety of interests. There are options that can be found based on academic, political, cultural, and athletic interests. If a student doesn't find an organization that fits their specific interest or need, they can create their own.

Athletics
Smith's athletic teams have been known as the Pioneers since 1986. The name expresses the spirit of Smith's students and the college's leading role in women's athletics (the first women's basketball game was played at Smith in 1893).

A new spirit mark was unveiled to the Smith community in December 2008. The new visual identity for Smith's sports teams marks the culmination of a yearlong project to promote visibility and enthusiasm for Smith's intercollegiate and club teams—and to generate school spirit broadly. The spirit mark is used for athletics uniforms, casual apparel, and promotional items for clubs and organizations. As Smith was the first women's college to join the NCAA, the new mark is seen as linking the college's pioneering alumnae athletes to their equally determined and competitive counterparts today. Smith athletes won some of the early national intercollegiate women's tennis championships in singles (Louise Raymond, 1938 and 1939) and doubles (1933, 1935, 1938 and 1948).

Smith College does not have college colors in the usual sense. Its official color is white, trimmed with gold, but the official college logo is blue and yellow (a previous logo was burgundy and white). NCAA athletic teams have competed in blue and white (or blue and yellow, in the case of the soccer, crew, swimming, and squash teams) uniforms since the 1970s and selected Pioneers as the official name and mascot in 1986. Popular club sports are free to choose their own colors and mascot; both Rugby and Fencing have chosen red and black.

Smith has a rotating system of class colors dating back to the 1880s when intramural athletics and other campus competitions were usually held by class. Today, class colors are yellow, red, blue, and green, with incoming first-year classes assigned the color of the previous year's graduating class; their color then "follows" them through to graduation. Alumnae classes, particularly at reunions, continue to identify with and use their class color thereafter.

Cultural organizations
There are 11 chartered cultural organizations that fall under the UNITY title: the Asian Students’ Association (ASA), Black Students’ Alliance (BSA), Chinese Interregional Student Cultural Org (CISCO), South Asian Student Association of Smith (EKTA), Indigenous Smith Students and Allies (ISSA), International Students Organization (ISO), Korean Students Association (KSA), the Latin American Students Organization (LASO), Multiethnic Interracial Smith College (MISC), Smithies of Caribbean Ancestry (SOCA), and the Vietnamese Students Association (VSA). Smith College Website Multicultural Affairs The Black Students’ Alliance is the oldest of all Unity organizations. In the Fall of 2012, as an effort to document the history of students of color on the Smith campus, the Weaving Voices Archives Project was created.

Academic year eventsConvocation signals the start of the fall semester. For new students, it is the first chance to experience Smith College's tradition and spirit. Likewise, for some returning students, the annual event is like a big, welcome-home party as well as an occasion for celebration and an opportunity for creative attire. House communities develop imaginative themes for group fashion, and Smith seniors put special touches on favorite hats to create their own unique "senior hats," to be worn for the first time at Convocation.Mountain Day is observed early in the fall semester. The president of the college selects a crisp, sunny, beautiful autumn day when the leaves are in full color, and announces the cancellation of classes by having bells rung on campus at 7:15 AM on the chosen day. The eager anticipation of Mountain Day leads to intense speculation about meteorology by students in the weeks leading up to the surprise announcement. Traditional observance of Mountain Day by students might involve New England road trips or outdoor pursuits, and college dining services provides box lunches to be taken off-campus. Many of the Houses go apple picking together.Cromwell Day, named for Smith's first African-American student, Otelia Cromwell, and her niece Adelaide Cromwell, began in 1989 to provide students with an in-depth program specifically addressing issues of racism and diversity. Afternoon classes are canceled, and students are invited to participate in lectures, workshops, symposia, and cultural events focused on a different theme each year. In 2020, Otelia Cromwell Day was renamed "Cromwell Day" to simultaneously honor Otelia Cromwell's niece Adelaide Cromwell, Smith College's first African-American faculty member.Rally Day In February 1876, the college began an annual observance of George Washington's birthday. In 1894, a rally became part of the day's events, and the focus of the celebration became primarily patriotic rather than exclusively social—though always with a women's college twist. Students that year staged a mock debate on the subject, "Does Higher Education Unfit a Man for Domestic Life?" In 1906 the celebration was first referred to as Rally Day (although the name was not used officially by the college until 1992). In 1944, seniors made Rally Day the first public wearing of their graduation caps and gowns; since then, mortarboards have been replaced by wacky, often homemade hats. Today, the Rally Day Convocation is centered on a historical theme and features a distinguished keynote speaker and the awarding of Smith College Medals to accomplished alumnae.

Reunions and commencement events
The Alumnae Association of Smith College hosts official class reunions every five years. All alumnae from all classes are welcome to return in any year; "off-year" alumnae attend campus-wide events as the "Class of 1776."

Traditional reunion and Commencement events are linked, and celebrate the close ties between Smith's alumnae and its graduating seniors and their families. At the conclusion of final exams, most underclassmen leave the campus, while seniors remain in their houses for a week to celebrate and prepare for Commencement. Alumnae arrive for reunions later in the week, and many alumnae arrange for official accommodations in the campus houses, right alongside senior residents.Ivy Day, the day before Commencement, is the high point of reunion and a significant event for seniors as well. Junior ushers lead a parade through campus, carrying vines of ivy to be planted by the departing seniors as a symbol of their lifelong connection to the college. Alumnae (and, often, their children), dressed in white and wearing sashes in their class color, line up in reverse order by class along both sides of the route. Seniors line up nearest the end of the parade route, wearing traditional white outfits and each carrying a single red rose. All cheer each alumnae class as it marches past, then fall in to join the end of the parade. Many alumnae classes carry signs with humorous poems or slogans, or hold balloons or wear hats in their class color. Ivy Day festivities conclude in the Quad, where the seniors plant their ivy and speakers address alumnae on the progress of fundraising and the state of the college.Illumination Night, beginning at dusk on the Saturday evening before Commencement, is a celebration of the campus and a send-off of sorts for graduating seniors. Throughout the central campus, electric street lights are replaced for one night by multicolored Japanese-style paper lanterns, lit with real candles. These hang on both sides of every walking path and cast a soft glow over the buildings and lawns. Student a cappella singing groups and improv comedy troupes roam the campus, stopping occasionally to entertain the crowds. A jazz band, hired by the college, turns the science building's courtyard into a dance floor. Seniors, alumnae, faculty, and their families spend the evening on walking tours of the illuminated campus and Botanic Gardens. The major official event of the night is the Senior Step Sing: seniors gather on the steps of Neilson Library, where they are serenaded by members of the Sophomore Push''' committee and then are physically pushed off the stairs and "into the real world."

Until the early 1990s, all alumnae reunions were held during Commencement weekend. However, as the number of returning alumnae grew beyond the capacity of the campus, reunions were split into Reunion I/Commencement Weekend and Reunion II, held the following weekend. "Significant" reunions (50-, 25- and 10- year, but also 2-year) and the earliest reunion classes (65-year and prior) are assigned to Reunion I; other reunions (5-, 15-, 20-, 30-year, and so on) are assigned to Reunion II.

There have been several controversies surrounding commencement over the years. See Smith College commencement controversies to learn more.

Environmental sustainability

Smith has taken numerous steps toward environmental sustainability, including a 30% reduction in energy use. Also, through a contract with Zipcar, the college has reduced the need for individually owned-cars on campus. Complementing this effort, the college has also promoted sustainability through academics and through the arts.

In keeping with its sustainability efforts, all Smith dining locations have discontinued the use of "to-go" supplies which included paper cups and plates, as well as plastic utensils. They now encourage students to bring their own, reusable containers and utensils if they wish to bring food back to their rooms. Smith College provides all students with a reusable drink container at the beginning of each academic year. In past years, these containers have been variations on travel mugs, Sigg bottles, and Nalgene. Those dining halls that still offer "To-Go" options no longer provide paper bags and instead use wax paper bags, biodegradable plastic, and recyclable utensils made of vegetable cellulose. In the fall of 2017, Smith dining halls began to offer plastic Tupperware containers students may borrow and return to the dining halls to be washed.

For Smith's efforts regarding sustainability, the institution earned a grade of "A−" on the "College Sustainability Report Card 2010" administered by the Sustainable Endowments Institute. Smith was lauded for many of the indicator categories, including student involvement, green building, and transportation, but was marked down for endowment transparency.

Notable alumnae

Among the more notable of Smith College's alumnae in chronological order are:

 Otelia Cromwell (class of 1900): first African-American graduate of Smith College and the first African American woman to receive a doctorate from Yale
 Blanche Hinman Dow (class of 1913): former president of the American Association of University Women
Clara Savage Littledale (Class of 1913): writer and war reporter for Good Housekeeping, and Parents editor for over thirty years.
 Eunice Carter (class of 1921): first female African-American assistant district attorney for the state of New York, active in the prosecution of mob boss Charles "Lucky" Luciano
 Margaret Mitchell (class of 1922): author of Gone with the Wind, did not graduate from Smith
 Mary Watson Weaver (class of 1925): composer and poet
 Julia Child (class of 1934): chef, author, and television personality 
 Madeleine L'Engle (class of 1941): author best known for A Wrinkle in Time Betty Friedan (class of 1942): feminist and author of The Feminine Mystique Nancy Reagan (class of 1943): First Lady of the United States from 1981 to 1989
 Penny Chenery (class of 1943): sportswoman, racehorse breeder, and owner, horse racing advocate
 Jean Harris (class of 1945): headmistress of the Madeira School who murdered her ex-lover Herman Tarnower in a jealous rage
 Rhoda Dorsey (class of 1946): historian and first woman president of Goucher College
 Barbara Bush (class of 1947): former First Lady of the United States, did not graduate from Smith
 Mary Otis Stevens (class of 1949): American architect
 Natalie Babbitt (class of 1954): notable illustrator and author of Tuck Everlasting Sylvia Plath (class of 1955): poet, novelist, and short story author
 Gloria Steinem (class of 1956): founder of Ms. magazine and noted feminist, activist, and journalist
 Lynden B. Miller (class of 1960): public garden designer, park advocate, and author
 Jane Yolen (class of 1960): children's book author
 Ng'endo (Florence) Mwangi (class of 1961): Kenya's first woman physician
 Anne Mollegen Smith (née Anne Rush Mollegen), (class of 1961), first woman editor-in-chief of Redbook
 Jane Harman (class of 1966): U.S. Representative for California's 36th Congressional District
 Molly Ivins (class of 1966): journalist, political commentator, and humorist
 Shelly Lazarus (class of 1968): former CEO and Chairman of Ogilvy & Mather
 Niki Tsongas (class of 1968): U.S. Representative for Massachusetts' 3rd Congressional District
 Catharine MacKinnon (class of 1968): notable proponent of radical feminism, scholar, lawyer, teacher and activist
 Laura D'Andrea Tyson (class of 1969): economist; Director of the National Economic Council
 Yolanda King (class of 1976): activist
 Christine McCarthy (class of 1977): Chief Financial Officer of The Walt Disney Company
 Ann M. Martin (class of 1978): author of The Babysitter's Club Phebe Novakovic (class of 1979): Chairman and CEO of General Dynamics
 Ruth Ozeki (class of 1980): author of A Tale for the Time Being Margaret Edson (class of 1983): winner of a Pulitzer Prize for Drama
 Tammy Baldwin (class of 1984): United States Senator; first openly LGBT person to be elected to congress
 Tori Murden (class of 1985): the first woman to row solo across the Atlantic Ocean, and to ski to the geographic South Pole
 Thelma Golden (class of 1987): Director and Chief Curator of The Studio Museum in Harlem
 Durreen Shahnaz (class of 1989): founder of Impact Investment Exchange (IIX)
Becca Balint (class of 1990): current member of the United States House of Representatives from Vermont
 Jennifer Chrisler (class of 1992): executive director of the Family Equality Council
 Piper Kerman (class of 1992): Orange Is the New Black author, lived in Chapin House
 Deborah Archer (class of 1993): first Black person to be elected President of American Civil Liberties Union (ACLU)
 Kim Janey (class of 1994): first woman and first Black person to serve as mayor of the City of Boston
 Hanya Yanagihara (class of 1995): author and editor
 Emily W. Murphy (class of 1995) Administrator of the General Services Administration under Donald Trump
 Dorie Clark, (class of 1997): author and executive education professor
 Luma Mufleh (class of 1997): founder and director of Fugees Family, Inc.
 Cass Bird (class of 1999): fashion photographer
 Erin Morgenstern (class of 2000): The Night Circus author
 Sara Haines (class of 2000): co-host of The View, ABC News correspondent
 Rubaiyat Hossain (class of 2002): filmmaker of feature films Under Construction and Made in Bangladesh
 Sharmeen Obaid-Chinoy (class of 2002): documentarian, winner of two Academy Awards
 Julia Scott (class of 2002): NPR and New York Times journalist
 Kimberly Drew (class of 2012): art curator and cultural critic

Notable staff

 Herbert Baxter Adams (1850–1901), educator, historian, and cofounder of the American Historical Association taught history at Smith from 1878 to 1881.
 Newton Arvin, American literary critic and academic
 Leonard Baskin, an artist who taught at Smith from 1953 to 1974
 Mary Ellen Chase, educator and author, taught English at Smith from 1926 to 1955.
 Emily Hale, speech and drama teacher, and muse of T.S. Eliot
 Louise Holland (1893–1990), academic, philologist and archaeologist, taught here from 1957 to 1964
 Yusef Abdul Lateef, an American jazz multi-instrumentalist and composer, thought to be one of the most influential musicians of the 20th century, taught at Smith during the early 2000s.
 Sylvia Plath (1932–1963), a great American poet and erudite, was an English professor from 1957 to 1958. 
 Kurt Vonnegut, served as Writer-in-Residence during the 2000–2001 school year
 Jane Zielonko, translator of The Captive Mind (1953), taught English at Smith from 1946.

In 1960, three Smith professors, one who had been there for 38 years, were fired or "allowed to retire" for being gay. This was chronicled in a book (The Scarlet Professor—Newton Arvin: A Literary Life Shattered by Scandal (Doubleday, 2001), by Barry Werth), and the PBS Independent Lens film, The Great Pink Scare''. It was also depicted in an opera based on Werth's book in 2017 at Amherst College. In 2002, Smith, the nation's largest liberal arts college for women, acknowledged a wrong from four decades earlier by creating a lecture series and a small scholarship—the $100,000 Dorius/Spofford Fund for the Study of Civil Liberties and Freedom of Expression, and the Newton Arvin Prize in American Studies, a $500 annual stipend. But despite faculty appeals, there was no apology.

See also
 Cambridge School of Architecture and Landscape Architecture
 College Archives (Smith College)
 Tofu Curtain
 Smith College commencement controversies
 SS Smith Victory – a cargo ship named after Smith College

References

Bibliography

 Horowitz, Helen Lefkowitz. Alma Mater: Design and Experience in the Women's Colleges from Their Nineteenth-Century Beginnings to the 1930s, Amherst: University of Massachusetts Press, 1993 (2nd edition).

External links

 
 The Sophian, Smith's student newspaper

 
1871 establishments in Massachusetts
Buildings and structures in Northampton, Massachusetts
Educational institutions established in 1871
Liberal arts colleges in Massachusetts
Seven Sister Colleges
Universities and colleges in Hampshire County, Massachusetts
Women's universities and colleges in the United States
Private universities and colleges in Massachusetts